Torricelli's experiment was invented in Pisa in 1643 by the Italian scientist Evangelista Torricelli (1608-1647). The purpose of his experiment is to prove that the source of vacuum comes from atmospheric pressure.

Context
For much of human history, the pressure of gasses like air was ignored, denied, or taken for granted, but as early as the 6th century BC, Greek philosopher Anaximenes of Miletus claimed that all things are made of air that is simply changed by varying levels of pressure. He could observe water evaporating, changing to a gas, and felt that this applied even to solid matter. More condensed air made colder, heavier objects, and expanded air made lighter, hotter objects. This was akin to how gasses really do become less dense when warmer, more dense when cooler. 

Aristotle stated in some writings that "nature abhors a vacuum", and also that air has no mass/weight. The popularity of that philosopher kept this the dominant view in Europe for two thousand years. Even Galileo accepted it, believing that it's the pull of vacuum that creates a siphon, a pull overcome if the siphon is high enough.

In the 17th century, Evangelista Torricelli conducted experiments with mercury that allowed him to measure the presence of air. He would dip a glass tube, closed at one end, into a bowl of mercury and raise the closed end up out of it, keeping the open end submerged. The weight of the mercury would pull it down, leaving a partial vacuum at the far end. This validated his belief that air/gas has mass, creating pressure on things around it. The discovery helped bring Torricelli to the conclusion:

This test was essentially the first documented pressure gauge.

Blaise Pascal went farther, having his brother-in-law try the experiment at different altitudes on a mountain, and finding indeed that the farther down in the ocean of atmosphere, the higher the pressure.

Procedure
The experiment uses a simple barometer to measure the pressure of air, filling it with mercury up until 75% of the tube. Any air bubbles in the tube must be removed by inverting several times. After that, a clean mercury is filled once again until the tube is completely full. The barometer is then placed inverted on the dish full of mercury. This causes the mercury in the tube to fall down until the difference between mercury on the surface and in the tube is about 760 mm.  
Even when the tube is shaken or tilted, the difference between the surface and in the tube is not affected due to the influence of atmospheric pressure.

Conclusion

Torricelli concluded that the mercury fluid in the tube is aided by the atmospheric pressure that is present on the surface of mercury fluid on the dish. He also stated that the changes of liquid level from day to day are caused by the variation of atmospheric pressure. The empty space in the tube is called the Torricellian vacuum.

760 mmHg = 1 atm
1 atm = 1 013 mbar or hPa
1 mbar or hPa = 0.7502467 mmHg
1 pascal = 1 Newton per square metre (SI unit)
1 hectopascal is 100 pascals

Additional images

References

1643 in science
Science and technology in Italy
Physics experiments
Pressure